Miroslav Bošković (born January 3, 1947) is a former Serbian football player. He was capped 6 times for Yugoslavia.

Nicknamed "Galeb", he begin his career playing in NK Zadar from where he moved to HNK Hajduk Split. In 1973, he signed with FK Partizan and two years later he moves to France to play with Angers SCO. He also worked two years as sports correspondent from France for Slobodna Dalmacija before returning to Yugoslavia and finishing his career playing with FK Sinđelić Beograd.

Honours
Hajduk Split 
 Yugoslav Cup: 1966–67

References

External links
Profile on Serbian federation official site

1947 births
Living people
Footballers from Belgrade
Yugoslavia international footballers
Yugoslav footballers
Serbian footballers
Serbian expatriate footballers
Yugoslav First League players
NK Zadar players
HNK Hajduk Split players
FK Partizan players
Angers SCO players
Ligue 1 players
Expatriate footballers in France
Association football defenders